Amalda montrouzieri is a species of sea snail, a marine gastropod mollusc in the family Ancillariidae, the olives.

Description

Distribution

References

 Souverbie, M., 1860. Descriptions d'espèces nouvelles de l'Archipel calédonien. Journal de Conchyliologie 8: 311–326
 Fischer-Piette, E., 1950. Listes des types décrits dans le Journal de Conchyliologie et conservés dans la collection de ce journal. Journal de Conchyliologie 90: 8–23

External links
 Souverbie, M., 1860. Description d'espèce nouvelles de l'Archipel calédonien. Journal de Conchyliologie 8: 204–207

montrouzieri
Gastropods described in 1860